Village West is a $1.2 billion  retail, dining and entertainment development that opened in 2002 in Kansas City, Kansas. It is located at the intersection of Interstates 70 and 435 ( from Downtown KCK). Village West is the most popular tourist destination in the state, and has significantly fueled growth in KCK and Wyandotte County.

Attractions
 Kansas Speedway
 Hollywood Casino
 Children's Mercy Park, home to Sporting Kansas City of Major League Soccer.
 Legends Field, home to the Kansas City Monarchs of the American Association.
 Dave & Buster's

Former attractions
 Schlitterbahn Kansas City, a $750 million,  resort and waterpark billed as the largest entertainment project in Kansas history, opened across I-435 from Village West in 2009. The park closed in 2018.

Shopping 
 Legends Outlets Kansas City, a large lifestyle center with shops, restaurants and entertainment
 Cabela's outdoor outfitter
 Nebraska Furniture Mart

Lodging 
 Great Wolf Lodge, Indoor Waterpark And Resort
 Chateau Avalon, a luxury bed and breakfast.
 Hampton Inn

References

External links 
The Legends at Village West

Buildings and structures in Kansas City, Kansas
Tourist attractions in Wyandotte County, Kansas